Mario Arnoldo Montoya (born in El Salvador) was a Salvadoran footballer.

Club career
A free-kick specialist, Montoya played for Atlético España, Juventud Olímpica and others between 1947 and 1957.

International career
Nicknamed Marilet, Montoya was part of the national team that won the 1954 Central American and Caribbean Games. Alongside the famous Juan Francisco Barraza, he scored three goals during the tournament.
He also scored twice against Panama a year earlier at the CCCF Championship.

Retirement
After retiring he became a salesman of birdcages.

References

External links
 La gesta futbolística del 54 - El Diario de Hoy 
 Consejos del pasado - El Salvador.com 

Year of birth missing (living people)
Salvadoran footballers
El Salvador international footballers
Living people

Association football forwards
Competitors at the 1954 Central American and Caribbean Games
Central American and Caribbean Games gold medalists for El Salvador
Central American and Caribbean Games medalists in football